Michael Matthew-Paul Turk (born March 14, 1998) is an American football punter who plays college football for the Oklahoma Sooners. He previously played for Lafayette and Arizona State. Despite declaring for the 2020 NFL Draft he would regain two years of eligibility after not being selected and not being signed following the draft.

Early years
Turk attended Ridge Point High School, where he played safety, contributing to the school winning the 6A Region Championship in 2014 and 2015. In less than three years, Turk suffered three ACL tears, which hampered his ability to become a safety at the next level. After graduating, he took a year off to train with his brother, Ben Turk, a former punter for Notre Dame, during which he decided that he wanted to become a punter.

College career

Lafayette 
Turk accepted a football scholarship from Lafayette College. As a true freshman in 2017, where he registered over 2,800 punting yards and setting a school single-season record with an average of 42.7 yards per attempt. He received second-team All-Patriot League honors.

Arizona State 
In 2018 after Turk's freshman season, he transferred to Arizona State University and was redshirted to comply with the NCAA transfer rules.

As a sophomore in 2019, against Kent State University, Turk recorded punts of 64, 62, 65, 49 and 75 yards, setting an NCAA single-game record with a 63.0-yard average per attempt. He earned honorable-mention All-American honors from GPR Analytics while ranking fourth in the nation with a 95.80 GPR Punt Rating. On January 6, 2020, he opted to declare for the 2020 NFL Draft.

NFL Combine

On February 27, 2020, Turk set an NFL Scouting Combine record for punters, with 25 bench press repetitions of 225 pounds. Of those who participated, Turk's total bench reps were more than all 33 wide receivers, 12 out of 13 tight ends, with Josiah Deguara tying him, and 19 offensive lineman out of 34. His bench reps also tied for second among special teams participants since 2006.

On June 3, after failing to be selected by a team, in an unprecedented decision, the NCAA restored Turk's remaining two years of eligibility and allowed him to return to Arizona State. As a junior in 2020, due to the COVID-19 pandemic, Arizona State only played 4 contests during the season. He registered a career-high 47.2-yard average on 14 punts and received first-team All-Pac-12 honors.

Oklahoma 
On August 5, 2021, Turk entered his name into the NCAA transfer portal, in part due to his opposition to Arizona State requiring the COVID-19 vaccine to travel to road games. On August 12, he announced that he would be transferring to the University of Oklahoma.

Professional career
On March 3, 2023, Turk competed in his second NFL Combine in preparation for the 2023 NFL Draft.

Personal life
Turk's uncles are former NFL punter Matt Turk and former NFL long snapper Dan Turk. Turk has a YouTube channel called Hangtime, where he uploads videos about his experience playing for Oklahoma, fitness, and his Christian faith, often mentioning some of his favorite Bible verses. As of March 2023, he has 225,000 subscribers to his YouTube channel. On November 19, 2022, he proposed to his now Fiancé, Oklahoma Sooners Softball All-American Grace Lyons, on the field following the OU-OSU Bedlam football game.

References

External links
 Michael Turk's YouTube Channel - Hangtime
 
 Oklahoma Sooners bio
 Arizona State Sun Devils bio
 

1998 births
Living people
Players of American football from Dallas
American Calvinist and Reformed Christians
American Christians
American football punters
Lafayette Leopards football players
Arizona State Sun Devils football players
Oklahoma Sooners football players
Commentary YouTubers
YouTube vloggers
Lifestyle YouTubers
YouTubers from Texas
Sports YouTubers